Ouangolodougou may refer to:

Ouangolodougou, Burkina Faso
Ouangolodougou, Ivory Coast
Ouangolodougou Department, Ivory Coast

See also
Ouango (disambiguation)